Munaganoor is a village in Ranga Reddy district in Telangana, India. It falls under Abdullapurmet mandal. It covers an area of .Munaganoor village is rapidly expanding towards Hayathanagar in the north and Torrur in the south through the main road with the establishment of banks, state level schools and colleges.

sports
In this area cricket is most preferable played game. They conduct cricket tournaments every year as  M P L 
from past three years. This tournaments are organized well as to encourage local players to get into mandal level. 
Now recently they conducted a tournament called MPL-3.

References

Villages in Ranga Reddy district